Australia has a population of about 25 million, with recent survey estimating between 200,000 and 350,000 recreational hunters in the country. There are around 5.8 million legally owned guns in Australia, ranging from airguns to single-shot, bolt-action, pump-action, lever-action or semi-automatic firearms.

A survey of recreational hunters identified the following usage rates of particular hunting methods: rifle, 92.3%; bow, 16.4%; black powder muzzleloader, 3.4%; shotgun, 56.1%; dogs only, 8.6%; and other, 3.3% The University of Queensland estimates that hunters invest $556,650,000 annually into the Australian economy.

Game species
Many species of game animals in Australia have been introduced by European settlers since the 18th century. Among these are traditional game species such as deers, red foxes and upland birds (quails, pheasants and partridges), as well as other invasive species including rabbits/hares, cats, dogs, goats, pigs, donkeys, horses, feral cattle (including banteng), water buffaloes and camels.  Native waterfowls are also targeted, and the commercial harvest of kangaroos by professional hunters was recorded as 1,560,586 in 2012.

The most commonly hunted animals by recreational hunters are rabbits, foxes, ducks, feral pigs, feral cats and feral goats. Hunting of rabbits, in particular, is encouraged across all of Australia, as they are considered a highly invasive pest, and the most common form of hunting is ground shooting.

The recreational hunting of foxes is also commonly done by shooting.  However, this usually requires other techniques to lure the animal (e.g. using a fox whistle, which makes a sound mimicking a distressed prey) and then spotlighting the eyeshine to locate and shoot the animal.

Six species of deer can be found in Australia.
The chital deer (Axis axis) is also known as the Indian spotted deer; they are light to dark brown with permanent white spots which appear as broken lines running along the body. They typically have three tined antlers.
The hog deer (Axis porcinus) is a close relative of the chital; they range from a uniform dark brown during winter to a rich reddish-brown in summer, at which time light-coloured spots along the sides and on either side of the dark dorsal stripe are visible in individuals. Typically, they have three tined antlers, but extra points are not unheard of.
The sambar deer (Rusa unicolor) is the largest deer species to be found in Australia. They are normally brown, but individuals of grey to almost black are seen. Typically, they have three tined antlers, but they often sported with a wide variety of styles.
The rusa deer (Rusa timorensis) is a close relative of the sambar but smaller in size; they are a uniform grey-brown, variable between individuals and season. It typically has three tined antlers.
The red deer (Cervus elaphus) ranges from a dull brown in winter coat to a rich reddish brown in summer; a permanent straw-coloured rump or caudal patch is retained throughout the year
The fallow deer (Dama dama) is the most common species of deer in the world. In the summer, they are light to reddish brown with white spots. In the winter, this changes to a greyish brown.

Legislation
Laws related to hunting vary between each state or territory. Except where otherwise stated, most states and territories allow the hunting of pest species – feral dogs, feral goats, feral pigs, foxes, hares, and rabbits – at any time of year with the landowner's permission. Every state and territory requires those carrying firearms to be licensed to do so.

Australian Capital Territory
All that is required to hunt in Australian Capital Territory is a valid firearms licence. Individuals between the ages of 12 – 17 can hold a minor's firearms licence, allowing them to hunt under adult supervision. However, hunting is restricted to pest animals on private property and may only be carried out with the landowner's permission.

New South Wales
New South Wales allows the hunting of some deer during open season and the hunting of all other deer and specified game animals on private land and crown land at any time throughout the year.

In NSW game species include ducks, which may be hunted under the New South Wales Game Bird Management Program, as well as wild deer, California quails, partridges, pheasants, peafowl and turkeys.

Dogs, cats and hares are classified as both feral and game.

Northern Territory
The Northern Territory freely allows the hunting of feral animals on private land with the landowner's permission as long as the hunter holds a valid firearms licence. This excepts feral pigs and waterfowl, for which a permit is required to hunt on certain reserves.

As well as species that can be hunted anywhere in Australia, the Northern Territory considers many animals to be feral: Arabian camels, buffaloes, banteng, cane toads, donkeys, feral cats, horses, wild dogs, feral cattle, house sparrows, pigeons, sambar deer, rusa deer, chital and turtle doves.

All waterfowl hunters require a permit to hunt and may only do so during the declared open season. Waterfowl includes the following species: magpie geese, Pacific black duck, wandering whistling duck, plumed whistling duck, grey teal, pink-eared duck, hardhead duck, maned duck.

Queensland
In Queensland, some native species (with a permit) and all pest species may be hunted at any time of the year with the landowner's permission. A weapons licence is required to carry firearms.

No species are declared as game animals. Many animals are declared pests in Queensland. Species commonly hunted include red deer, chital, fallow deer, rusa, dingo, feral dog, rabbits, hares, cats, foxes, goats, pigs, dogs, donkeys, horses and feral cattle.

South Australia
South Australia allows the hunting of game species during open season. Species listed as game are the stubble quail, Pacific black duck, grey teal, chestnut teal, Australian shelduck, pink-eared duck and maned duck.

Some native species and all introduced species may be hunted at any time of the year. Namely camels, deer, starling, domestic pigeon, European blackbird and the spotted turtle-dove.

Tasmania
A game licence is required to hunt in Tasmania, pests and feral creatures are eligible to be hunted on private, state and crown land.

Pests can be hunted on crown land at any time, however on private and state land hunts are only carried out with explicit permission from the owner of the private land.

Minor permits in both firearms and hunting can be applied for if under the age of 18 years. There are two different grades of minor permits available to those between 12 – 16 and 16 – 18 years.

Tasmania classifies as game species: deer, wild duck, brown quail and pheasant. For non-commercial purposes, muttonbirds and wallabies may also be hunted.

Victoria
Victoria makes no restrictions on the hunting of pest or feral animals in state forests, or on private lands as long as the hunter has permission from the landowner.  Both hares and feral dogs are classified as pests, and can be hunted at any time throughout the year.

Hunting of game species is allowed during open seasons under a state licence scheme.  Game licence numbers in Victoria:
 Duck — 26,200
 Quail — 29,000
 Deer — 32,000

Victoria allows the hunting of many native and introduced species, including stubble quail, pheasants, partridges, European quail, California quail, Pacific black duck, grey teal, hardhead, Australian shelduck, pink-eared duck, Australian wood duck, chestnut teal, Australasian shoveller, hog deer, red deer, sambar deer and fallow deer.

Western Australia
In Western Australia, only feral species may be hunted on private land with the landowner's permission, subject to holding a valid firearms licence. These species include camels, donkeys, feral cattle, wood ducks, feral dogs, feral horse, hares and starling.

Aboriginal hunting
Aboriginal Australians lived on the Australian continent for thousands of years before Europeans settlement in the late 1700s. They had a wealth of animals to hunt and had very refined and sometimes ingenious ways of hunting them.

Hunting techniques

Boomerang

Boomerangs have been used as a hunting tool by Aborigines for tens of thousands of years. The way a hunter tends to use a boomerang is to rustle tree branches, causing the birds inside to be startled and fly into nets that the hunter had already set up between trees. Contrary to popular belief, Aboriginal hunting boomerangs are not designed to return to the thrower.

Throwing sticks
Related to the boomerang, a throwing stick is bigger and heavier. These heftier weapons are used to hunt bigger animals such as kangaroos. They were thrown straight at their target and could even break bones on impact. This made it a lethal tool in the hands of an experienced hunter.

Fire
Aboriginals use fire to clear vegetation from patches of land to make it easier to hunt game. Among the animals hunted are monitor lizards. Surprisingly in areas where the technique is used, the lizard population increases by as much as 100%. This is thought to be because burning established vegetation clears land for the growth of new plant species, increasing biodiversity thus improving the lizards' habitat.

Legal framework
The National Parks and Wildlife Conservation Act 1975 (Cth) mandates Aboriginal people are not subject to general conservation restrictions so long as they engage in hunting only for food, ceremonial or religious purposes (in all cases must be non-commercial). However, restrictions may be put in place to protect wildlife and must specifically state that such restrictions apply to Aboriginal people. This section does not give an Aboriginal person right of entry onto land.  Entry onto private land, state forests, national parks or other kinds of crown land is regulated under State or Territory Legislation and is variable.

Controversy
There has been a number of controversies surrounding indigenous Australians and the Australian government regarding their hunting rights.
In 1993, the Australian Government brought in legislation called the Native Title Act. This act meant that the Australian Government recognised that the Aboriginal Australians have rights to and interests to their land that come from their traditional laws and customs. One of the activities that are covered by the Native Title is the right for Aboriginal peoples to hunt otherwise endangered species for food or ceremonial purposes. The killing of endangered is a wide source of outrage with many calling for a rewrite of the legislation to protect the endangered species.

See also
 Invasive species in Australia

References

External links

 NSW DPI Hunting
 Victoria Department of Sustainability and Environment
 Game Management Authority of Victoria

 
Animal culling
Animal rights
Cruelty to animals